Oskar Woldemar Pihl (11 February 1890 in Moscow – 22 August 1959 in Helsinki) was a Finnish silversmith and Fabergé workmaster, born in the Russian Empire, brother of Alma Pihl. Workmaster in August Holmström's workshop, he made small items such as enameled tie pins. His hallmark is OP.

Pihl moved to Finland due to the Russian Revolution (1917–1923).

References
 Bainbridge, H. C.: Peter Carl Fabergé: Goldsmith and Jeweller to the Russian Imperial Court. 1966.
 Постникова-Лосева, М. М. & Платонова, Н. Г. П. & Ульянова, Б.Л.: ЗОЛОТОЕ И СЕРЕБРЯНОЕ ДЕЛО XV–XX вв. 2003.
 Hill, Gerard & Smorodinova G. G. & Ulyanova, B. L.: Fabergé and the Russian master Goldsmiths. 2008.

Notes

External links
 Biography of Oskar Woldemar Pihl 

Finnish silversmiths
Silversmiths from the Russian Empire
Fabergé workmasters
1890 births
1959 deaths
Finnish people from the Russian Empire
White Russian emigrants to Finland